Kevin Rafferty (born 1981) is a Gaelic footballer who plays for St Eunan's and, also formerly, for the Donegal county team (between 2001 and 2012).

He played in midfield for his county team.

He has also played Saturday League association football for Glencar Celtic since around about 2017. He plays golf too and is a member of Letterkenny Golf Club.

Early life
Rafferty was educated at Scoil Colmcille and St Eunan's College in Letterkenny.

Rafferty is one of five sons of Martin and Marie. His four brothers are Patrick ("Pajo"), Dwyer, Fergal and Declan. Kevin and Pajo Rafferty have played together for Glencar Celtic, Pajo though did not have the same abilities in Gaelic football as his brother. The Rafferty brothers also have a sister.

Playing career
Rafferty featured under five different Donegal managers—Mickey Moran, Brian McEniff, Brian McIver, John Joe Doherty and Jim McGuinness. He was often paired with Rory Kavanagh in midfield, though was often injured too.

Rafferty was present in Jim McGuinness's teams of the 2010s, including in the 2011 Ulster semi-final defeat of Tyrone when he scored. A squad member during Donegal's 2012 All-Ireland winning campaign, he accompanied the team on their end-of-year holiday to Dubai. However, he stepped away from the panel as its most senior member at the end of the 2012 season, having been dogged by injury over the previous twelve months.

Honours
Donegal
 All-Ireland Senior Football Championship: 2012
 Ulster Senior Football Championship: 2011, 2012

St Eunan's
 Donegal Senior Football Championship: … 2007, 2008, 2009, 2012, 2014

Glencar Celtic
 Voodoo Venue Cup: 2019, 2020

References

External links
 Official profile
 
 Kevin Rafferty at gaainfo.com

1981 births
Living people
Donegal inter-county Gaelic footballers
Gaelic footballers who switched code
Glencar Celtic F.C. players
People educated at St Eunan's College
Republic of Ireland association footballers
St Eunan's Gaelic footballers
Winners of one All-Ireland medal (Gaelic football)
Association footballers not categorized by position